Eupithecia ronkayi is a moth in the family Geometridae. It is found in northern Thailand and western Myanmar.

The forewings are dark brown with a soft reddish tinge and the hindwings are greyish white.

References

External links

Moths described in 2009
Moths of Asia
ronkayi